Kimberly Hill (born November 30, 1989) is an American former professional volleyball player who played as an outside hitter for the United States women's national volleyball team. Hill won gold with the national team at the 2014 World Championship, the Rimini Volleyball Nations League, and the 2020 Tokyo Summer Olympics, and bronze at the 2016 Rio Olympic Games.

Early life
Kimberly Hill was born in Portland, Oregon to Bradd and Terri Hill. She has three siblings: Kelsey Hill, Shelby Hill, and Caitlin Volk.

Career
Hill graduated from Portland Christian High School in 2008. She played four years of indoor volleyball (2008-11) for Pepperdine University and two years of beach volleyball (2012-13).

Hill was the first college volleyball player to earn AVCA All-American first team honors in both indoor and beach. She received the accolades in 2011 with the indoor squad, and in 2012 and 2013 on the beach. Hill was also the 2011 West Coast Conference Player of the Year and the WCC's Female Scholar-Athlete of the Year. She was a member of the inaugural AVCA national champions in the sport of beach volleyball in 2012.

Hill won a gold medal at the 2014 World Championship when the USA national team defeated China 3–1. She was also selected tournament's Most Valuable Player and Second Best Outside Spiker. Hill won the 2016 World Grand Prix Best Outside Hitter individual award and the silver medal.

Hill won the 2016–17 CEV Champions League gold medal with VakıfBank Istanbul when her team defeated the Italian Imoco Volley Conegliano 3–0 and she was also awarded Best Outside Spiker. She was selected to play the Italian League All-Star game in 2017.

On June 7, 2021, US National Team head coach Karch Kiraly announced she would be part of the 12-player Olympic roster for the 2020 Summer Olympics in Tokyo. Hill saw action as a serving specialist, and won the gold medal with her team. Shortly after the Olympic Games concluded, she officially announced her retirement from the US National Team.

Clubs
  Pepperdine Waves (2008–2012)
  Atom Trefl Sopot (2013–2014)
  AGIL Volley (2014–2015)
  Vakıfbank Istanbul (2015–2017)
  Imoco Volley Conegliano (2017–2021)

Awards

Individual
 2014 FIVB World Championship "Most Valuable Player"
 2014 FIVB World Championship "Best Outside Spiker"
 2015–16 CEV Women's Champions League "Best Outside Spiker"
2015–16 Turkish Women's Volleyball League "Most Valuable Player"
 2016 World Grand Prix "Best Outside Spiker"
 2016–17 CEV Champions League "Best Outside Spiker"
 2017–18 CEV Champions League "Best Outside Spiker"
 2019 FIVB Volleyball Women's Club World Championship "Best Outside Spiker"

Clubs
 2014–15 Coppa Italia -  Champion, with AGIL Volley Novara
 2015–16 CEV Champions League -  Runner-Up, with Vakıfbank Istanbul
 2015–16 Turkish Women's Volleyball League -  Champion, with Vakıfbank Istanbul
 2016 Club World Championship -  Bronze medal, with Vakıfbank Istanbul
 2016–17 CEV Champions League -  Champion, with VakıfBank Istanbul
 2017 Club World Championship -  Champion, with VakıfBank Istanbul
 2017–18 Italian League -  Champion, with Imoco Volley Conegliano
 2018 Italian Supercup -  Champions, with Imoco Volley Conegliano
 2018–19 Italian League -  Champion, with Imoco Volley Conegliano
 2018–19 CEV Champions League -  Runner-Up, with Imoco Volley Conegliano
 2019 Italian Supercup -  Champions, with Imoco Volley Conegliano
 2019 FIVB Volleyball Women's Club World Championship -  Champion, with Imoco Volley Conegliano
 2020 Italian Supercup -  Champions, with Imoco Volley Conegliano
 2020-21 Italian Cup (Coppa Italia) -  Champion, with Imoco Volley Conegliano
 2020–21 Italian League -  Champion, with Imoco Volley Conegliano
 2020–21 CEV Women's Champions League -  Champion, with Imoco Volley Conegliano

National team
 2013  FIVB World Grand Champions Cup	
 2013  Women's NORCECA Volleyball Continental Championship
 2014  FIVB World Championship 	
 2015  FIVB World Grand Prix	
 2015  FIVB Women's World Cup
 2015  Women's NORCECA Volleyball Continental Championship
 2016  Women's NORCECA Olympic Qualification Tournament
 2016  FIVB World Grand Prix
 2016  Summer Olympics
 2017  FIVB World Grand Champions Cup	
 2018  FIVB Volleyball Women's Nations League
 2019  FIVB Volleyball Women's Nations League
 2019   FIVB Women's Volleyball Intercontinental Olympic Qualifications Tournament (IOQT) - Qualified
 2019  FIVB Women's World Cup
 2019  Women's NORCECA Volleyball Continental Championship
 2021  FIVB Volleyball Women's Nations League
 2020  2020 Summer Olympics

References

External links
 

1989 births
Living people
American women's volleyball players
Pepperdine Waves women's volleyball players
Sportspeople from Portland, Oregon
Volleyball players at the 2016 Summer Olympics
Volleyball players at the 2020 Summer Olympics
Olympic gold medalists for the United States in volleyball
Olympic bronze medalists for the United States in volleyball
Medalists at the 2016 Summer Olympics
Medalists at the 2020 Summer Olympics
Expatriate volleyball players in Italy
Expatriate volleyball players in Poland
Expatriate volleyball players in Turkey
American expatriate sportspeople in Italy
American expatriate sportspeople in Poland
American expatriate sportspeople in Turkey
VakıfBank S.K. volleyballers
Outside hitters
Serie A1 (women's volleyball) players
21st-century American women